John Hickman (March 2, 1837 – December 24, 1904) was a Second Class Fireman in the Union Navy during the American Civil War, where he earned the Civil War Congressional Medal of Honor. Hickman was born in  Blair County, Pennsylvania on March 2, 1837, and lived in that county for his entire life.

Military service 
He entered Service in the US Navy from Pennsylvania, and eventually rose to the rank of Second Class Fireman during the Civil War. He served on board the USS Richmond, which was dispatched towards Port Hudson, Louisiana, as a part of a squadron of Union vessels that attempted to strengthen the blockade of Confederate ports in the Gulf of Mexico. On March 14, 1863, he committed the act that would merit him the Medal of Honor. On that day, the squadron attempted to head up the river towards the enemy port, with their ship second in line. The ship was hit and damaged by a 6-inch solid rifle shot which shattered the starboards safety-valve chamber and port safety valve as it rounded a bend beneath the fortifications. The ship was forced to withdraw, as the steam room was filled with hot steam. After realising the ship was in danger of exploding, Fireman Joseph Vantine, Second Class Fireman John Hickman, First Class Fireman Mathew McClelland, and Fireman First Class John Rush, wrapped the wet cloth around their faces and  entered the  hot steam room to haul out the fires, relieving each other when they were overcome by heat. Their actions saved the ship, and led to each of them being awarded a Medal of Honor.

Medal of Honor Citation 
Hickman was given his medal of honor through the War Department, General Orders No. 17 on July 10, 1863:" Served on board the U.S.S. Richmond in the attack on Port Hudson, 14 March 1863. Damaged by a 6-inch solid rifle shot which shattered the starboard safety-valve chamber and also damaged the port safety-valve, the fireroom of the U.S.S. Richmond immediately became filled with steam to place it in an extremely critical condition. Acting courageously in this crisis, Hickman persisted in penetrating the steam-filled room in order to haul the hot fires of the furnaces and continued this action until the gravity of the situation had been lessened."

Post-Military 
After the Civil War, Hickman returned to his home in Blair County, Pennsylvania. He continued living there until he died at the age of 67 on December 24, 1904. He was buried in Calvary Cemetery.

References 

1837 births
1904 deaths
United States Navy Medal of Honor recipients
United States Navy sailors
Union Navy sailors
People of Pennsylvania in the American Civil War
People from Blair County, Pennsylvania
American Civil War recipients of the Medal of Honor